Shades of My Mind is Taiwanese Mandopop artist Stanley Huang's 4th Mandarin studio album. It was released on 29 October 2004 by EMI Music Taiwan.

Track listing
 浴缸 (Yu Gang) - Drowned
 我是你的誰  (Wo Shi Ni De Shei) - Who's Your Daddy
 鴕鳥式沉默 (Tuo Wu Shi Chen Mo) - Suppression
 黑的意念 (Hei De Yi Nian) - Shades of My Mind
 複製人軍隊 (Fu Zhi Ren Jun Dui) - Army Of Clones
 感染 (Gan Ran) - Contagious
 樓梯間 (Lou Ti Jian) - Rendezvous
 忙與盲 (Mang Yu Mang) - Busy And Blind
 世界只有我們 (Shi Jie Zhi You Wo Men) - Only U
 緣投與阿醜2004 (Yuan Tou Yu A Chou 2004) - Handsome and Ugly 2004

References

2004 albums
Stanley Huang albums